Najibullah Lafraie was the Foreign Minister of Afghanistan between 1992 and 1996.

Education
Lafraie obtained a BA in Law and Political Science from Kabul University. He later completed an MA and Ph.D. in Political Science from the University of Hawaii.

Career
Lafraie returned to Afghanistan and joined the Afghani liberation movement against the Soviet invasion during the 1980s.

Lafraie was appointed as Minister of Information in the Interim Government of Afghanistan in 1989 and as Minister of State for Foreign Affairs in the Islamic State of Afghanistan in 1992. He served in that position until the Taliban seized Kabul in September 1996.

Lafraie and his family fled to Australasia in the late 1990s. He was refused refugee status in Australia in 1999. In September 2000 he was granted refugee status in New Zealand. He currently lectures in the Politics Department at the University of Otago.

Criticism
Lafraie has been criticised by the Revolutionary Association of the Women of Afghanistan and Support Association for the Women of Afghanistan for his membership of Jamiat Islami, a group allegedly responsible for various atrocities during the 1990s.

At the time of being granted refugee status, the then leader of the opposition Jenny Shipley criticised Lafraie's involvement with the Afghan government and disagreed with the decision to grant him refugee status.

References

Year of birth missing (living people)
Academic staff of the University of Otago
University of Hawaiʻi at Mānoa alumni
Living people
New Zealand Muslims 
Jamiat-e Islami politicians
Afghan emigrants to New Zealand
Afghan expatriates in Pakistan
Foreign ministers of Afghanistan
Information ministers of Afghanistan
Afghan refugees